Shankarapatnam Keshavapatnam is a village in Shankarapatnam  mandal of Karimnagar district in the state of Telangana in India.

References 

Villages in Karimnagar district